Tools Up! is a local co-op party video game, developed by The Knights of Unity and published by All in! Games. The game was released for Microsoft Windows, PlayStation 4, Xbox One and Nintendo Switch in December 2019.

Gameplay 
In Tools Up!, the players take the role of a home renovator. The goal is to renovate apartments within the time limit while the owners are away. There are certain tasks, such as cleaning up the area, painting, moving furniture, and other activities related to redecorating, to complete. The game has two modes: Campaign Mode and the Party Mode, and up to four players can play together.

Development 

Before the release, Tools Up! was presented at several events, including Gamescom 2019, PAX West 2019, and Tokyo Game Show 2019.

Reception 

After the release, the game was met with "mixed or average" reviews from critics, with an aggregate score of 72/100 for PlayStation 4, and 62/100 for Nintendo Switch and Xbox One on Metacritic. Forbes listed Tools Up! as one of the video games families loved playing in 2019. The Escapist said that the game has some good ideas, but that it needs more polish. Le Soir criticized the lack of an online mode, noting that the game quickly shows its limits.

References

External links 
Official website

2019 video games
Nintendo Switch games
Xbox One games
PlayStation 4 games
Simulation video games
Video games developed in Poland
Windows games
All in! Games games
Multiplayer and single-player video games